In Ugrian mythology, Kaltes-Ekwa (Khanty, Kaltes Ankw) was the mother of the hero Mir-Susne-Hum and the wife of the god Num-Torum, who defeated her in heaven. She was also a goddess of the moon associated with the month April; a birth giving goddess (she is called upon by women in child-birth); goddess of fate; goddess of dawn and a shape-shifter, often shown manifested as a hare.

An animal sacred to her, the hare appearance shows her lunar nature, for the hare is a lunar creature; many cultures, when looking at the moon see the outline of the hare, who lives in the moon. The hare is often seen as an intermediary between lunar deities and humans, so the appearance of Kaltes in this form indicates her accessibility to her people. Kaltes is known as a fertility goddess and a goddess of rejuvenation. She is called upon by women in childbirth, for she is especially venerated as a promoter of the beginning of the life cycle. Although she is somewhat feared because she can determine people's destinies, she is mostly revered for her gentle wisdom. She is a compassionate guide to the mysteries of life.

External links and references

"A rise of Mir-Susne-Hum." Graphic cycle dedicated to a national Ugrian (Ostyak - Hant and Vogul - Mansi) hero.
World view of the Hanti
Webpage dedicated to Kaltes

Ob-Ugrian gods
Lunar goddesses
Childhood goddesses
Fertility goddesses
Time and fate goddesses
Shapeshifting
Mythological rabbits and hares